Nuala O'Connor may refer to:

 Finola O'Donnell, born Finola O'Connor and also known as Nuala, 15th-century Irish noblewoman
 Nuala O'Connor (technologist), privacy expert who served as First Chief Privacy Officer for the US Department of Homeland Security from 2003 to 2005
 Nuala Ní Chonchúir, also known as Nuala O'Connor, Irish writer